Damla is a feminine Turkish name. In Turkish, "Damla" means "Drop" (of water or rain).

Name 
 Damla Çakıroğlu (born 1994), Turkish volleyball player
 Damla Demirdön (born 1990), Turkish football player
 Damla Deniz Düz (born 1995), Turkish water polo player
 Damla Günay (born 1982), Turkish archer
 İrem Damla Şahin (born 2000), Turkish women's footballer

Turkish feminine given names